Van Hunt is the debut album of R&B singer-songwriter Van Hunt, released on February 24, 2004, by Capitol Records. Recording sessions for the album took place at Capitol Records, Westlake Audio, Sunset Sound, Sage & Sound Studio, and Zac Recording in Los Angeles, House of Blues in Memphis, and The Sound Kitchen in Nashville.

The album charted at number 38 on the US Billboard Top R&B/Hip-Hop Albums and number 14 on the Billboard Top Heatseekers. The single "Dust" was nominated for a Grammy Award for Best Urban/Alternative Performance in 2005.

Composition 
Music journalist Will Hermes notes "sublimely janky '80s synths and melodies that jab and slide" on the album's songs. Rolling Stones Ernest Hardy finds Hunt's vocal style similar to those of Prince, Curtis Mayfield, and Marvin Gaye, and comments that the album's music evokes influences such as the Beatles, Muddy Waters, and Sly Stone. Neil Drumming of Entertainment Weekly perceives a lack of melisma in Hunt's singing, writing that he sings "clearly and crisply and sav[es] the crests and falls for the swirling synths, slick guitars, and percolating bass lines."

The album's subject matter is droll, stark, and confessional, and focuses on the pains of love, romance, and sex. Songs such as "Anything (To Get Your Attention)" and "Down Here (In Hell with You)" deal with dysfunctional relationships. On the latter track, Hunt asks "What would I do if we were perfect / Where would I go for disappointment?" "Highlights" has him musing on a failed affair, as he uses a metaphor: "Old lovers turned critics curse at you on the silver screen". "Precious" features a predominant Prince influence.

Reception 

Ernest Hardy of Rolling Stone found the album to have "no duds" and stated, "Unlike his neosoul brethren, [Hunt] wraps his seamlessly quilted voice around wry, off-kilter lyrics; his skewed views on love and life are wholly his. [...] The bar has been raised." Mojo called it "a remarkably coherent and focused album" and stated, There's real substance and soulfulness to be found".

Track listing

Personnel 
Credits adapted from liner notes.

 Van Hunt – arranger, producer, vocals, guitars, bass guitar, drums, keyboards, piano
 Jermaine Rand (guitar)
 Wendy Melvoin – guitar
 Chris Whitehead (guitar)
 Terry McMillen (harmonica)
 Daryl Richards (alto saxophone)
 Daniel Solammon [misspelled as Daniel Solomon] (tenor saxophone)
 Curtis Whitehead (tenor saxophone)
 Nolan Smith (trumpet)
 Isaac Curtis (trombone)
 Truth (Wurlitzer piano, Moog synthesizer)
 Dwight Farrell (celeste)
 Patrick Warren (Mellotron)
 Larry James (drums, percussion)
 Nick Northern (drums, percussion, background vocals)
Amy White – background vocals
 Ta Ta (background vocals)
 Andrew Slater – producer
 Howard Willing – producer
• Dave Way- mixing
 Tim LeBlanc – mixing
 Peter Mokran – mixing
 Melissa Mattey – mixing

Charts

References

External links 
 Van Hunt at Discogs
 Van Hunt his own funky, soulful man — Chicago Tribune
 Van Hunt: Player's Anthem — Vibe

2004 albums